Carangopsis (from  , 'scad/horse mackerel' and   'look') is an extinct genus of prehistoric bony fish that lived from the early to middle Eocene.

Species 
 †Carangopsis analis Agassiz, 1835  
 †Carangopsis brevis (Blainville, 1818) 
 †Carangopsis dorsalis Agassiz, 1835  
 †Carangopsis latior Agassiz, 1835 
 †Carangopsis maximus Agassiz, 1835

See also

 Prehistoric fish
 List of prehistoric bony fish

References

Eocene fish
Prehistoric perciform genera
Taxa named by Louis Agassiz